Khánh Hội may refer to several places in Vietnam:

 Khánh Hội, Cà Mau, a rural commune of U Minh District
 , a rural commune of Yên Khánh District